The golden viscacha rat or golden vizcacha rat (Pipanacoctomys aureus) is the single species of the genus Pipanacoctomys of the rodent family Octodontidae.  It has 92 chromosomes and has been regarded as tetraploid (4x = 2n). This octodontid and its sister-species, the plains viscacha rat (Tympanoctomys barrerae) (2n = 102), may have arisen from the diploid mountain viscacha rat (Octomys mimax), (2x = 2n = 56) as a result of the doubling and subsequent loss of some chromosomes. However, some genetic studies have rejected any polyploidism in mammals as unlikely, and suggest that amplification and dispersion of repetitive sequences best explain the large genome size.

Description
The dorsal fur is golden-blond and the underparts are white.

Distribution and habitat
The species is known from Catamarca Province of northwestern Argentina, where specimens are known only from the Salar de Pipanaco, a salt flat. This habitat consists largely of low, salt-loving shrubs, and the soil consists of sand with high levels of salt. It feeds on the halophytic plants growing there. The genus is named after the locale, with “octo” being a reference to the figure-eight ridge on its cheek tooth.

Status
It lives among the salt-loving plants that live between the salt pans and the desert. 
It is threatened by conversion of its very restricted habitat to agricultural use, for the growing of olives, and its population trend is downwards. The International Union for Conservation of Nature has rated its conservation status as "critically endangered".

References

Octodontidae
Mammals described in 2000
Mammals of Argentina
Endemic fauna of Argentina
Taxobox binomials not recognized by IUCN
High Monte